M. G. Soman (28 September 1941 – 12 December 1997) was an Indian actor and former Indian Air Force officer who appeared in Malayalam films. He was one among the leading star actors doing hero roles in Malayalam Cinema during the late 1970s and early 1980s. He has also done roles in Tamil films Aval Oru Thodar Kathai, Naalai Namadhe, Kumara Vijayam and Airport. However, in the late 1980s and 1990s, he switched to character and villainous roles.

Early life 
He was born as Somashekharan Nair to Konni Kudukkillethu Veettil Govinda Panicker and P. K. Bhavani Amma, in Thiruvalla, Travancore, on 28 September 1941. He had his primary education from Balikamadom H. S. S., Thiruvalla, St Thomas HSS Thirumoolapuram. While studying at seventh grade he started a drama troupe with his friend and performed drama Manaltharikal Garjikkunnu. He did his pre-university degree at St. Berchmans College, Changanassery. He was also part of the Indian Air Force.

Film career
Soman joined Kottarakkara Sreedharan Nair's drama troupe Jayasree and then moved to the film industry. He worked at Kerala Arts Theaters and KPAC. Ramarajyam of Kerala Arts Theaters opened him a way to the movie industry. His first film was Gayatri directed by P. N. Menon in 1973. He acted in the role of a hero from 1976 to 1983 and later played the roles of villains, comedians and supporting roles. In 1977, his best known film was released under the direction of I. V. Sasi – Itha Ivide Vare. He soon rose to become the busiest actor in the industry. In 1978, Soman had acted in 44 films , which was till today kept as a record. After 1984, he had shifted from heroic roles to character roles, notably in films like Poochakkoru Mookkuthi. In 1997, Lelam, directed by Joshiy, was his last film and his performance as Aanakkattil Eappachan was greatly appreciated and received critical acclaim. He died on 12 December 1997 due to jaundice. He was 56. He produced a Malayalam movie titled as Bhoomika in 1991 which was directed by I.V.Sasi, starring Jayaram, Suresh Gopi, Mukesh and Urvashi in lead roles.

Personal life
Soman was married to Sujatha. They have a son Saji Soman and a daughter Sindhu. His son Saji also acted in a few movies. Saji is married to Bindu and has a son Shekhar and a daughter Shivanghe. Sindhu Soman is married to Girish and has two daughters, Lekshmi Girish and Gayatri Girish.

Awards
Kerala State Film Awards:

Best Actor (1976) – Thanal, Pallavi
Second Best Actor (1975) – Swapnadanam, Chuvanna Sandhyakal

Filmography

 Gayathri (1973) as Rajamany
 Mazhakkaru (1973) as Gopi
 Maadhavikutty (1973)
 Chukku (1973)
 Jeevikan Marannu Poya Sthree (1974)
 Pancha Thanthram (1974) as Prince in the dance drama 
 Chattakari (1974) as Richard
 Rajahamsam (1974)
 Manyasree Viswamithran (1974) as Ramesh
 Thacholi Marumakan Chandu (1974)
 Aval Oru Thodar Kathai (1974) as Chandrasekhar (Tamil Film)
 Utsavam (1975) as Bhargavan
 Picnic (1975) as Chudala Muthu
 Chattambikkalyaani (1975) as Kochu Thampuran
 Pulival (1975) 
 Makkal (1975) 
 Ullasa Yaatra (1975) 
 Mattoru Sita (1975) 
 Odakuzhal (1975) 
 Bharye Avasyamundu (1975) 
 Rasaleela (1975) 
 Dharmaksetre Kurushetre (1975) 
 Thiruvonam (1975) 
 Mucheettukalikarente makal (1975) 
 Sooryavamsham (1975) 
 Tourist Bungalow (1975)
 Chuvanna Sandhyakal (1975) 
 Abhimaanam (1975) 
 Malsaram (1975)
 Naalai Namadhe (1975) as Ravi (Tamil Film)
 Anubhavam (1976)
 Ayalkkari (1976) as Suku 
 Sindooram  (1976)
 Rajankanam (1976)
 Kayamkulam Kochunniyude Makan (1976)
 Amrithavahini  (1976) as Sudhakaran
 Madhuram Thirumaduram  (1976)
 Agnipushpam (1976)
 Swapnadanam (1976) as Mohan
 Paalkkadal (1976)
 Kuttaum Shikshayum (1976)
 Seemantha Puthran (1976)
 Abhinandanam (1976)
 Missi (1976)
 Romeo (1976)
 Swimming Pool (1976)
 Vazhivilakku (1976)
 Ponni (1976)
 Pickpocket (1976)
 Samasya (1976)
 Surveykkallu (1976)
 Aruthu (1976)
 Mohiniyattom (1976)
 Chennay Valathiya Kutti (1976)
 Pushpasharam (1976)
 Pallavi (1976)
 Kumara Vijayam (1976) as Vinoth (Tamil Film)
 Guruvayoor Kesavan (1977)
 Innale Innu (1977)
 Oonjaal (1977) as Rajan
 Shankupushppam (1977) as Gopi
 Abhinivesham (1977) as Venu
 Muttathe Mulla (1977) as Babu
 Randu Lokam (1977) as Balan
 Ormakal Marikkumo (1977) as Aravindan 
 Itha Ivide Vare (1977) as  Vishwanadan
 Ammayi Amma (1977)
 Shivathandavam (1977)
 Ivan Ente Priya Putran (1977)
 Chakravarthini (1977)
 Sreedevi (1977)
 Vishukani (1977)
 Akale Akasham (1977)
 Saritha (1977)
 Anjali (1977)
 Lekshmi (1977)
 Snehayamuna (1977)
 Agninakshathram (1977)
 Aparajitha (1977)
 Veedu Oru Swargam (1977)
 Anthardaaham (1977)
 Sujatha (1977)
 Harshabashpam (1977)
 Makam Piranna Manka (1977)
 Muhoorthangal (1977)
 Sooryakanthi (1977)
 Tholkkan Enikku Manassilla (1977)
 Aasheervaadam (1977)
 Panchamrutham (1977)
 Swarnamedal (1977)
 Vezhambal (1977)
 Mannu (1978)
 Aval Vishwasthayayirunnu (1978) as James
 Aniyara (1978)
 Rathinirvedam (1978) as Krishnan Nair 
 Mattoru Karnan (1978) 
Avalude Ravukal (1978)
 Padmatheertham (1978) as Karunan
 Lisa (1978)
 Kalpavriksham (1978) as Surendran
 Nivedyam (1978) as Dr.Gopakumar
 Nakshatrangale Kaval (1978)
 Iniyum Puzhayozukum (1978) as Prabhakaran
 Eetta (1978) as Gopalan
 Kaathirunna Nimisham (1978) as Gopi
 Avalkku Marannamilla (1978)
 Mukuvane Snehicha Bhootam (1978) as Rajan
 Maattoli (1978)
 Velluvili (1978) as Soman
 Thanal (1978)
 Arum Anyaralla (1978) as Prabhakaran
 Priyadarshini (1978)
 Vadagekkoru Hridayam (1978)
 Snehikkan Oru Pennu (1978)
 Rajan Paranja Katha (1978)
 Premashilpi (1978)
 Hemendaratri (1978)
 Avakasham (1978)
 Rappadikalude Gadha (1978)
 Njan Njan Matram (1978)
 Satrathil Oru Ratri (1978)
 Mattoru Karnan (1978)
 Nalumanipookal (1978)
 Astamudikayal (1978)
 Nakshatrangale kaval (1978)
 Anumodanam (1978)
 Padmatheertham (1978)
 Anubhoothikalude Nimisham (1978)
 Orkkuka Vallapozhum (1978)
 Adimakkachavadam (1978)
 Ashokavanam (1978)
 Theerangal (1978)
 Randu Janmam (1978)
 Jayikkanayi Janichavan (1978)
 Visharoopam (1978)
 Saayoojyam (1979) as Balan
 Idavazhiyile Poocha Minda Poocha (1979) as Bhagyanath 
 Itha Oru Theeram (1979) as Gopi
 Vellayani Paramu (1979) as Ithikkara Pakki
 Chuvanna Chirakukal (1979)
 Rakthamillatha Manushyan (1979) as Shivan
 Manasa Vacha Karmana (1979)
 Prabhatha Sandhya (1979) as Gopi
 Ezham Kadalinakkare (1979) as Soman
  Jeevitam Oru Gaanam (1979) as Johny 
Ivide Kattinu Sugandam (1979) as Gopi
 Neeyo Njaano (1979) as Damu
 Choola (1979)
 NityaVasantham (1979) as Balan
 YakshiParu (1979) as Balan
 Pratheeksha (1979) as Balan
 Anubhavangale nandi (1979) as Balan
 Pathivratha (1979) as Balan
 Lovely (1979) as Balan
 Amrithachumbanam (1979) as Balan
 Thuramukham (1979) as Balan
  Chandra Bimbam (1980) 
 Kadalkattu (1980)
 Muthuchippikal (1980) as Sasi
  Aniyatha Valakkal (1980) as Balan
 Prakadanam (1980) as Jose
 Pralayam (1980) as Shivan Kutti
 Aagamanam (1980) as Venu
 Raagam Thaanam Pallavi (1980) as Jayachandran
 Pavizhamuthu (1980)
 Dooram Arike (1980)
 Puzha (1980)
 Oru varsham Oru Masam (1980)
 Thirayum Theeraum (1980)
 Pappu (1980)
 Akalnagalil Abayam (1980)
 Ithile Vannavar (1980)
 Ivar (1980)
 Hridayam Padunnu (1980)
 Daliya Pookkal (1980)
 Saraswathiyamam (1980)
 Eden Thottam (1980)
 Avan Oru Ahangari (1980)
 Vayal (1981) as Govindankutty
 Agni Yudham (1981)
 Sphodanam (1981) as Surendran
 Pathirasooryan (1981) as Stephen 
 Kodumudikal (1981) as Bava
 Kadathu (1981) as Ravi
 Thaaraavu (1981) as Narayanankutty
 Swarangal Swapnagal (1981) as Prabhakaran
 Kolilakkam (1981) as Kumar
 Kathayariyathe (1981) as Vishwanatha Menon 
 Raktham (1981) as Venu
 Itha Oru Dhikkari (1981) as Raju
 Sahasam (1981)
 Manassinte Theerthayatra (1981)
 Enne Snehukku Enne Matram (1981)
 Vadaka Veetile Athithi (1981)
 Ithihasam (1981)
 Sambavam (1981)
 Visham (1981)
 Veliyettam (1981)
 Vazhikal Yatrakkar (1981)
 Sreeman Sreemathi (1981)
 Ethiralikkal (1982) as Antony
 Beedikunjamma (1982) as Madhavan
 Oru Vilipadakale (1982) as Major Unnikrishnan
 Raktha Sakshi  (1982)
 Thuranna Jail (1982) as Rajan
 Karthavyam  (1982) as Sreekumar
 Sooryan (1982) as Venu
 Sree Ayappanum Vavarum (1982) as Raja Rajasekhara 
 Koritharicha Naal (1982) as Vijayan
 Aarambham (1982) as Basheer
 Priyasakhi Radha (1982)
 Drohi (1982)
 Aayudham (1982)
 Ivan Oru Simham (1982)
 Adarsham (1982)
 Dheera  (1982)
 Sariyalla saradha  (1982)
 Pinnilavu (1983) as Gopi
 Rathilayam (1983) as Soman
 Mahabali (1983) as Naradan
 Aa Rathri (1983) as All Kerala Abdu 
 Attakkalasam  (1983) as Vijayan
 Ee Yugam (1983)
 Aadyathe Anuraagam (1983) as Jayan
 Kaathirunna Divasam (1983) as Ravi
 Sandhya vandanam (1983) as Sasi
 Aana (1983) as Manth Raju
 Thavalam (1983) as Balan
 Deeparadhana (1983)
 Nadhi Muthal Nadhi Vare (1983)
 Ahankaram (1983)
 Kolakkomban (1983)
 Pourusham (1983)
 Katthi (1983)
 Adyathe Anuragam (1983)
 Poochakkoru Mookkuthi (1984) as Hari
 Koottinilamkili (1984) as Balachandran 
 Chakkarayumma (1984)
 Kodathy (1984) as Venu
 Thacholi Thankappan (1984) as Khader
 Nishedi (1984) as Rajasekharan
 Minimol Vathikkaanil (1984) as Doctor
 Nilavinte nattil (1984)
 Kadamattathachan (1984) as Pulimoottil Kariya 
 Krishna Guruvayoorappa (1984) as Villumangalam Swami
 Arante Mulla Kochu Mulla  (1984) as Panchayath President
 Poomadathe Pennu (1984)
 Oru Thettinte kadha (1984)
 Ayiram Abhilashangal (1984)
 Ente Gramam (1984)
 Edavelakku Shesham (1984)
 Agraham (1984)
 Sreekrishna parunthu (1984)
 Boeing Boeing (1985) as Lambodharan Pillai 
 Vasantha Sena (1985) as Sidhartha Menon 
 Aanakkorumma (1985) as Police officer
 Uyarum Njan Nadaake (1985)
  Premalekhanam  (1985) as Kesavan Nair 
  Pathamudayam  (1985) as B. G. Menon 
  Mulamoottil Adima  (1985) as Moiddhin (Special Appearance)
  Koodum Thedi  (1985) as Menon
  Njaan Piranna Naattil (1985) as Gopinath
  Adhyayam Onnu Muthal  (1985) as Narayanan 
  Aa Neram Alppa Dooram  (1985) as Sudhakaran
  Vannu kandu Keezhadakki  (1985)
  Orikkal Oridathu  (1985)
  Snehicha Kuttathinu  (1985)
  Aazhi  (1985)
  Gaayathridevi Ente Amma  (1985)
  Avidathe Pole Ividayum  (1985)
  Iniyum Kadha Thudarum  (1985)
  Onathumbikkoru Oonjal  (1985)
 Uyarum Njan Nadaake  (1985)
 Thalavattam (1986) as Dr. Raviandran 
 Sayam Sandhya (1986)
 Panchagni  (1986) as Mohandas 
 Kunjattakilikal  (1986) as Vishwanatha Menon 
 Sunil Vayassu 20  (1986) as Somashekharan 
 Sughamodevi  (1986) as Dr. Ambikadmajan Nair 
 Sanmanassullavarkku Samadhanam  (1986) as Rajendran's Uncle 
 Iniyum Kurukshethram  (1986) as Jayamohan
 Adukkan Entheluppam  (1986) as Williams 
 Nandi Veendum Varika  (1986) as Ananthan Nair 
 Veendum  (1986) as Alex
 Ambadi Thannilorunni (1986) as M G Menon
 Ithramathram (1986) as Colonel Rajasekharan
 Amme Bhagavathi (1986)
 Malarum Kiliyum (1986)
 Cabare Dancer (1986)
 Nilavinte Nattil (1986)
 Ivide Ellavarkkum Sukham (1987) as Shekhara Varma
 Vazhiyorakazhchakal (1987) as Ravi
 Vrutham  (1987) as Charlie
 Vilambaram  (1987) as Balagopalan 
 Thoovanathumbikal (1987) as Moni Joseph 
 January Oru Orma  (1987) as Menon 
 Jaalakam  (1987) as Appu's Father 
 Cheppu  (1987) as Principal
 Kadhakku Pinnil  (1987) as Palod
 Rithubetham (1987) as Receiver
 Nadodikattu (1987) as Himself
 Idanaazhiyil Oru Kaalocha (1987) as Prem Sankar
 Yagagni (1987)... Nambeesan
 Manivathoorile Aayiram Shivarathrikal  (1987) as John Samuel 
 Mangalya Charthu (1987) as Thomas
 1921 (1988)
 Chithram (1988) as Jail Superintendent
 Aryan (1988)
 Manu Uncle  (1988) as DySP
 Janmandharam  (1988) as Panikkar 
 Daisy (1988) as Balakrishna Menon 
 Aparan  (1988)
 Onninu Purake Mattonnu (1988) as Reghu
 Abkari  (1988) as Kunjappan
 Mukthi  (1988) as Hameed 
 Moonnam Pakkam  (1988)
 Oru Muthassikadha  (1988) as Mayinkutty
 Vellanakalude Naadu  (1988) as Prabhakaran
 Mukunthetta Sumitra Vilikkunnu  (1988) as C.P. Menon 
 Varnam  (1988) as Manu's Brother
 Puthiya Karukkal  (1988) as Udaya Varma
 Douthyam  (1989) as Col. Madhavan Nair
 Vandanam (1989)
 Avanikunnile Kinnari Pookkal (1989) as Jayamohan
 Kali karyamaai/ Crime Branch (1989) as Pushkaran
 Jaithra Yathra (1989) as  V P Menon
 No.20 Madras Mail (1990) as R.K. Nair 
 Varthamanakalam (1990) as Ravunni Mashu
 Aye Auto (1990) as  Police Commissioner
 Akkare Akkare Akkare (1990) as Police Commissioner
 Randam Varavu  (1990) as  R. Sreedharan Nair 
 Rajavazhcha  (1990) as Kuttan Nair 
 Mukham  (1990) as  Home Minister 
 His Highness Abdullah  (1990) as Kesava Pillai 
 Arhatha  (1990) as Chandrashekharan Nair
 Appu  (1990) as Police Officer 
 Midhya  (1990) as Appunni
  Ee Thanutha Veluppan Kalathu  (1990) as Kuwait Mani 
 Adwaitham (1991) as Shekharan 
  Inspector Balram  (1991) as Sahadevan 
  Neelagiri  (1991) as Shekhara Menon 
  Ulladakkam  (1991) as Mathachan 
  Njan Gandharvan  (1991) as Gopalakrishnan Nair 
  Ente Sooryaputhrikku  (1991) as Vinod Shankar 
  Bhoomika  (1991) as Raghavan Nair 
Mahassar  (1991) as Adv Venugopal
 Thalasthanam  (1992)
 Aardram  (1992) as Jail Warden
 Aparatha  (1992)  as Pilla
 Mahanagaram  (1992) as  Kumaran
 Congratulations Miss Anitha Menon (1992) as Sankaranarayanan
 Kallanum Polisum  (1992) as  SP
 Mafia (1993 film)  (1993) as Govindan
 Airport (1993) as Senior minister Krishnamoorthy (Tamil Film) 
 Arthana (1993) 
 Kabooliwala  (1994) as  Munna's Father 
 Commissioner (1994) as Balachandran Nair 
 Pakshe  (1994)
 Gentleman Security  (1994) as Unnithan
 Chukkan  (1994) as Parol Padmanabhan
 Rajakeeyam (1995) as Bharatha Varman
 Nirnayam (1995) as Dr. David Kurishinkal 
 Kaatttile Thadi Thevarude Ana  (1995) as Chief Minister 
 The King  (1995) as Alexander 
 Sundarimare Sookshikkuka (1995) as Raveendran
 Indraprastham (1996) as K.N. Nair 
 Rajaputhran (1996) as Veni's father 
 Hitler  (1996) as Professor 
 Sugavaasam (1996) as Ganapathi Iyyer
 Oru Yathramozhi (1997)
 Chandralekha (1997) as Doctor 
 Varnapakittu (1997) as Kuruvilla
 Lelam (1997) as Aanakkaattil Eappachan

TV
 Kuthirakal  (Doordarshan)
 Sahanam (Doordarshan)

References

External links
 

1941 births
1997 deaths
Male actors from Kerala
Indian Air Force personnel
Kerala State Film Award winners
20th-century Indian male actors
Male actors in Malayalam cinema
Indian male film actors
Indian male television actors
People from Thiruvalla
Male actors in Tamil cinema
Malayalam comedians
Indian male comedians
20th-century comedians
Male actors from Pathanamthitta